The palochka or palotchka (literally "a stick") is a letter in the Cyrillic script. The letter usually has only a capital form, which is also used in lowercase text. The capital form of the palochka often looks like the capital form of the Cyrillic letter soft-dotted  ( і), the capital form of the Latin letter  ( i), and the lowercase form of the Latin letter L (L l). The letter was introduced in the late 1930s.

History
In the early days of the Soviet Union, many of the non-Russian Cyrillic alphabets contained only letters found in the Russian alphabet to keep them compatible with Russian typewriters. Sounds absent from Russian were marked with digraphs and other letter combinations. The palochka was the only exception because the numerical digit 1 was used instead of the letter. In fact, on many Russian typewriters, the character looked not like the digit 1 but like the Roman numeral  with serifs. That is still common because the palochka is not present in most standard keyboard layouts (and, for some of them, not even the soft-dotted ) or common fonts and so it cannot be easily entered or reliably displayed on many computer systems.

Usage
In the alphabets of Abaza, Avar, Chechen, Dargwa, Ingush, Lak, Lezgian, and Tabassaran, it is a modifier letter which signals the preceding consonant as an ejective or pharyngeal consonant; this letter has no phonetic value on its own.

In Adyghe, the palochka by itself represents a glottal stop .
Example from Kabardian Adyghe dialect:  , "he asked her for something"

In Avar
Example from Avar:  , "to speak"

In Chechen, the palochka makes a preceding stop or affricate ejective if voiceless, or pharyngealized if voiced, but also represents the voiced pharyngeal fricative  when it does not follow a stop or affricate. As an exception, in the digraph ⟨х⟩, it produces the voiceless pharyngeal fricative . Ingush is similar.
Examples from Chechen:  , "girl" and  [], "sea"

Exceptionally among the Caucasian languages, Abkhaz does not use the palochka, but instead uses a series of special letters to distinguish ejective and non-ejective (aspirated) consonants.

Computing codes

 The lowercase form of the palochka was added to Unicode 5.0 in July 2006.

See also
 Cyrillic characters in Unicode

References

Abaza language
Adyghe language
Avar language
Chechen language
Dargwa language
Ingush language
Lak language
Lezgian languages
Kabardian language